Berikey (Bərəkəy; Dargwa: Берикей) is a rural locality (a selo) and the administrative centre of Berikeyevsky Selsoviet, Derbentsky District, Republic of Dagestan, Russia. The population was 3,028 as of 2010. The village has an Azerbaijani-majority. There are 26 streets.

Geography 
Berikey is located 28 km southwest of Derbent (the district's administrative centre) by road, on the Ulluchay River. Dzhemikent and Ullu-Terkeme are the nearest rural localities.

References 

Rural localities in Derbentsky District